Arun Shahapur is a Member of the Legislative Council for the State of Karnataka, India.  A member of the Bharatiya Janata Party, he has represented the Karnataka North-West Teachers constituency (which covers the districts of Belagavi, Bagalkot, and Vijayapur) since 2010, and was elected in June 2016 to a second six-year term.
He has also been working president of Karnataka's Rajya Madhyamika Shikshaka Sangha, its State Secondary Teachers Association

References

Living people
Members of the Karnataka Legislative Council
Year of birth missing (living people)